Cox's Bazar Railway Station is the proposed railway station of Bangladesh. It is a railway station which is being built near the bus terminal of the city of Cox's Bazar. It will be the most important terminal for transportation between Cox's Bazar and the rest of Bangladesh because of tourism. The construction of the railway station is likely to be end in 2023.

History 
Government of Bangladesh planned to expend the rail track from Dohazari of Chittagong to Gundum of Bandarban. The trans-Asian railway network was to be connected to proposed Ghumdhum railway station. Government also planned to build another railway track from proposed Ramu railway station to Cox's Bazar to make another railway station in Cox's Bazar city in the purpose of boosting the tourism in Cox's Bazar. The new railway line extended to Ghumdhum and proposed railway station in Cox's Bazar is building simultaneously. Construction started in August 2017. Its shape is like Oyster, which represent symbolism of the beach. The foundation stone of the station building was laid on 14 January 2021. Its construction cost is Tk 214 crore. In January 2022, the construction of the railway station was 45% complete.

See also
 Cox's Bazar Beach
 List of railway stations in Bangladesh

References

External links
 

Train
Railway stations scheduled to open in 2023